"I Wish That I Could Hurt That Way Again" is a song written by Curly Putman, Rafe Van Hoy and Don Cook, and first recorded by American country music artist Kenny Rogers, released in 1978 on his multi-million selling album The Gambler, although Rogers did not release it as a single the album included two number 1 singles in the title cut and "She Believes In Me".

T. Graham Brown released a cover version in April 1986 as the second single from his album I Tell It Like It Used to Be.  Brown's version reached #3 on the Billboard Hot Country Singles & Tracks chart.

Chart performance

References

1978 songs
1986 singles
Kenny Rogers songs
T. Graham Brown songs
Songs written by Curly Putman
Songs written by Don Cook
Songs written by Rafe Van Hoy
Capitol Records Nashville singles